Herbert J. Krapp (1887, New York City, - 1973, Florida) was a theatre architect and designer in the early part of the twentieth century.

Krapp was an apprentice with the Herts & Tallant firm until 1915. Between 1912 and 1916 Krapp began working directly with the Shubert brothers and eventually would become their primary architect. He also designed theatres for the Chanin brothers. Almost half of the current Broadway theatres were designed by Krapp, including the Lyceum, Shubert, Booth, New Amsterdam and Longacre Theatres. 
 
Krapp was well known for his ability to use his building space to its fullest potential. For the Majestic Theatre, Krapp incorporated stadium seating into the plans for the orchestra level, creating better sightlines and allowing for the creation of larger lounge and lobby areas. He designed the Ambassador Theatre on a diagonal plan to fit it into a small site. Krapp renovated the Winter Garden Theatre and the Helen Hayes Theatre in the 1920s. He also designed the Hotel Edison, the Lincoln Hotel (now the Row NYC Hotel), and numerous other buildings.

Although the stock market crash of 1929 brought an end to the theatre building boom, Krapp remained with the Shuberts until 1963, supervising the maintenance and renovations of the existing venues. He also experimented with inventing; one of the tools he created was patented and used by the U.S. Air Force. He died in Florida in 1973.

Buildings designed by Krapp

Current Broadway theatres
Ambassador Theatre
Brooks Atkinson Theatre
Ethel Barrymore Theatre
Biltmore Theatre
Bernard B. Jacobs Theatre
Broadhurst Theatre
John Golden Theatre
Helen Hayes Theatre (redesign)
Imperial Theatre
Majestic Theatre
Eugene O'Neill Theatre
Richard Rodgers Theatre
Gerald Schoenfeld Theatre
Neil Simon Theatre
Winter Garden Theatre (redesign)

Other notable buildings
Ed Sullivan Theater (originally Hammerstein's Theater; New York)
Forrest Theatre (Philadelphia) 
Hotel Edison (New York)
Lincoln Hotel (New York)
Morosco Theatre (New York; demolished 1982)
The Sardi's Building (New York)
 RKO Proctor's Theater (New Rochelle, New York)
Folly Theater, Kansas City, Missouri (renovation)
Loew's Woodside Theatre (1926), partially adaptively reused as St. Sebastian Roman Catholic Church (Queens, New York).
Boulevard Theater (Jackson Heights, New York)
Central Theatre (New York City)

References

External links and resources

Short history
Partial listing of theatre credits at Cinema Treasures
Broadway Theatres: History and Architecture, William Morrison, 1999, Dover Publications, 
Lost Broadway Theatres, Nicholas Van Hoogstraten, Princeton Architectural Press, 1997, 
The Shuberts Present: 100 Years of American Theater, Maryann Chach, Reagan Fletcher, Mark Evan Swartz, Sylvia Wang, Harry N. Abrams, 2001, 
 Shubert Organization Theatres  

1887 births
1973 deaths
American theatre architects
Architects from New York City
Defunct architecture firms based in New York City